Shatan may refer to:

Shatans, odd-looking creatures of Belarusian mythology
Chaim F. Shatan (1924–2001), Canadian psychiatrist
Shatan, Sichuan, a town in Wanyuan, Sichuan, China
Meijiuhe, a town in Renhuai, Guizhou, China, known as Shatan before 2016